Ghazbaniyeh (also Romanized as Ghaẕbānīyeh; also known as Raddeh-ye Ghaẕbānīyeh) is a village in Jazireh-ye Minu Rural District, Minu District, Khorramshahr County, Khuzestan Province, Iran. At the 2006 census, its population was 59, in 11 families.

References 

Populated places in Khorramshahr County